Jürgen Colombo (born 2 September 1949) is a retired track cyclist from West Germany, who won the gold medal in the Men's 4000m Team Pursuit at the 1972 Summer Olympics in Munich, alongside Günther Schumacher, Günter Haritz, and Udo Hempel.

References

External links
 

1949 births
Living people
German male cyclists
Cyclists at the 1972 Summer Olympics
Olympic cyclists of West Germany
Olympic gold medalists for West Germany
People from Zielona Góra
Sportspeople from Lubusz Voivodeship
Olympic medalists in cycling
Medalists at the 1972 Summer Olympics
German track cyclists
20th-century German people